Mucharz  is a village in Wadowice County, Lesser Poland Voivodeship, in southern Poland. It is the seat of the gmina (administrative district) called Gmina Mucharz.

The village has a population of 830.

References

Villages in Wadowice County